Vincent Paul Waller (born September 30, 1960) is an American writer, storyboard artist, animator, and technical director. He has worked on several animated television shows and movies, the most notable ones being The Ren & Stimpy Show and SpongeBob SquarePants.

The Ren & Stimpy Show
Waller was a writer and director for The Ren & Stimpy Show during the Spümcø era. He directed the episodes "Rubber Nipple Salesmen" and "Big Baby Scam".

Other shows
Waller produced and directed shorts for Fred Seibert's Oh Yeah! Cartoons. He co-created What is Funny? with Bill Burnett, as well as Pete Patrick: Private Investigator and Let's Talk Turkey. He also adapted the Harvey Kurtzman comic Hey Look! into a pilot episode for the series.

SpongeBob SquarePants and other work
Waller was a writer for animated television series SpongeBob SquarePants during the last half of the series' first season, leaving after the first season was completed. Waller returned to the series as technical director for the series' fourth season, and supervised the first season of Harvey Birdman, Attorney at Law. He worked on The Oblongs as a director, and later as re-take director. He was also a writer and storyboard artist on Cartoon Network's The Grim Adventures of Billy & Mandy and Evil Con Carne. Towards the end of the fourth season, Waller was promoted to creative director of SpongeBob, replacing Derek Drymon. In 2015, Waller was promoted to supervising producer and showrunner along with Marc Ceccarelli, succeeding Paul Tibbitt. The creative director position was then eliminated.

Waller served as the creative supervisor for The SpongeBob Movie: Sponge Out of Water. He also serves as co-executive producer and showrunner of the SpongeBob prequel series, Kamp Koral.

Filmography

Television series

Short films

Feature films

References

External links
 
 Incoherent Thought: Vincent Waller's Blog
 
 

American animators
Living people
Spümcø
American male voice actors
American television writers
American male television writers
Place of birth missing (living people)
American art directors
American television directors
American animated film directors
American storyboard artists
1960 births